Geoffrey Pullar (1 August 1935 – 25 December 2014) was an English cricketer, who played for Lancashire and Gloucestershire and in 28 Tests for England.

His affectionate nickname was 'Noddy', not, as often said, because, once he was out, he was known to sleep often in the dressing room, but because he was once discovered watching the children's programme there.

He was, in any case, a skilled batsman, rarely lifting the ball off the surface while driving elegantly and adept at accumulating by flicking the ball off his toes towards fine leg. Preferring to play off the front foot, Pullar was also a good puller of the ball and could crack a square cut. In his younger days he had been compared to Charlie Hallows and Eddie Paynter, two of Lancashire's crowd pleasing greats – he had the artistry of the former and the pugnacious aggression and watchful determination of the latter.

Life and career
Pullar was born in Swinton, Lancashire, in 1935, and was a product of Werneth Cricket Club, which was close to where he went to school in Oldham; while there he showed equal talent as a leg break bowler as well as with his batting – but with Tommy Greenhough, Bob Barber and Sonny Ramadhin variously based at Old Trafford, Pullar's bowling was rarely called upon in first-class cricket.

Originally a middle order batsman, the left-handed Pullar was tried as an opener in Test matches against India in 1959, and was an instant success, scoring 75 at Headingley, and 131 at Old Trafford, the first ever Test century by a Lancastrian at the ground. He then became a fixture in the England side for four years, making four centuries in all and averaging more than 43. Pullar did well against South Africa at home series of 1960, following a solid winter tour of the West Indies where he played in all five tests against a bowling attack including Wes Hall, Garfield Sobers and Charlie Griffith who had his debut in the fifth test. He had a good tour to India and Pakistan in 1961–62, and topped the batting averages despite bagging a pair in the first Test in Pakistan. His highest Test score was 175 against the South Africans at The Oval in 1960, when he put on 290 for the first wicket with Colin Cowdrey. He had modest success against the Australians in 1961, when Alan Davidson snared him five times, and Pullar only played twice against Pakistan in England in 1962, scoring only 27 runs in two knocks while others, notably Peter Parfitt, scored freely against a moderate attack. After the tour to Australia in 1962–63, during which he fell ill with pleurisy, Pullar lost his England place and never regained it.

After some years of declining success for Lancashire, he joined Gloucestershire in 1969, and topped the county's batting averages in his first season. But arthritis in his knees forced his retirement after just six matches the following year.

Pullar was elected Young Cricketer of the Year in 1959 by the Cricket Writers' Association (a year in which he scored three tons against the champions, Yorkshire) and he was one of the Wisden Cricketers of the Year in 1960. He also won a junior England cap for table tennis.

Pullar died at age 79 on 25 December 2014.

References

External links

1935 births
2014 deaths
England Test cricketers
English cricketers
English cricketers of 1946 to 1968
Gloucestershire cricketers
International Cavaliers cricketers
Lancashire cricketers
Marylebone Cricket Club cricketers
People from Oldham
People from Swinton, Greater Manchester
Players cricketers
Wisden Cricketers of the Year
North v South cricketers